HMS Racehorse was a R-class destroyer built for the Royal Navy during the Second World War.

Description
She was powered by two Parsons geared steam turbines, each driving one propeller shaft, using steam provided by two Admiralty three-drum boilers. Her complement was 176 officers and ratings.

The ship was armed with four 45-calibre 4.7-inch (120 mm) Mark IX guns in single mounts. For anti-aircraft (AA) defence, Racehorse had one quadruple mount for QF 2-pdr Mark VIII ("pom-pom") guns and six single  Oerlikon autocannon. She was fitted with two above-water quadruple mounts for  torpedoes. Two depth charge rails and four throwers were fitted for which 70 depth charges were provided.

Construction and career
She was built by John Brown & Company, Clydebank and launched in 1942. She was adopted by the civil community of Greater London during Warship Week in 1942.

The ship served in World War II, taking part in operations Balsam and Livery. She was placed in reserve in Portsmouth in 1946. She arrived at Troon for breaking up on 8 December 1949.

References

Bibliography
 

 
 
 
 
 

Q and R-class destroyers of the Royal Navy
Ships built on the River Clyde
1942 ships
World War II destroyers of the United Kingdom